KFTZ (103.3 MHz, "Z103") is a Top-40 (CHR) radio station located in Idaho Falls, Idaho. It is licensed, owned and operated by Riverbend Communications.

References

External links

FTZ
Contemporary hit radio stations in the United States